The Barron River (Indigenous: Bibhoora) is located on the Atherton Tablelands inland from Cairns in northern Queensland, Australia. With its headwaters below Mount Hypipamee, the -long river with a catchment area of approximately  forms through run off from the Mount Hypipamee National Park, flows through Lake Tinaroo, and eventually empties into the Coral Sea near .

Geography

Over time, some of the Mitchell River's former headwaters were diverted by natural forces into the Barron. These include the Clohesy River and other tributaries that used to flow northwest to the Gulf of Carpentaria. With the extra water now flowing over the -high Barron Falls, the steep, narrow Barron Gorge was formed. Much of the water that used to flow over the falls has now been diverted in upstream dams and used to generate electricity at the Barron Gorge Hydroelectric Power Station.

After passing under the Kuranda Range Highway's bridge and through Kuranda proper, it descends down the -high Barron Falls and reaches the Cairns floodplains near Smithfield. The Dinner Falls are located along the upper Barron River.

The river's catchment area includes the major tributaries flowing into Lake Tinaroo including Kauri, Mazlin, McLean, Maroobi, Peterson and Severin Creeks. It also absorbs most of the major tributaries on the Atherton Tableland, including Emerald Creek, Granite Creek, the Clohesy River and Stoney Creek. This also includes Thomatis Creek, which has only been connected to the Barron since 1932 and has been responsible for diverting part of the flow from the river. Freshwater Creek joins the Barron River below the Gorge and drains Lake Morris and the Lamb and Whitfield Ranges.

Before entering the Coral Sea, the river's delta splits into three distributaries, the main river channel, Thomatis/Richters Creek and Redden Creek. During times of flooding two other distributaries also operate – Barr Creek and Half Moon Creek.

The river is the sole source of sand for the beaches to the north of Cairns. Sand and gravel extraction from the river bed has supplied growing demand in the Cairns area. This has resulted in considerable beach erosion to the north.

History

The river's original Aboriginal name is Bibhoora. The river gained its current name in 1875 when two police sub-inspectors, Robert Arthur Johnstone and Alexander Douglas-Douglas, named it after Thomas Henry Bowman Barron (circa 1835 – 24 June 1882), chief clerk of police in Brisbane. The European discovery of the river was by James Venture Mulligan in 1874. Barron River gives its name to the electoral district of Barron River, a division of the Queensland Legislative Assembly formed in 1971.

Flooding
The lower reaches of the Barron River have a well-documented history of flooding dating from early last century. Tinaroo Falls Dams has little effect on the mitigation of floods. Both agricultural and residential areas can be affected. A network of rainfall and river height field stations was established in 1995 to provide a flood warning system for the Cairns City Council.

Heavy rain associated with a cyclone early in 1939 caused substantial flooding on the Barron River and resulted in the river changing its course.

Some of the river's worst flooding occurred in 1950. This was due to a major tropical cyclone following the contour of the Queensland coast for over a week.

Fauna
The stocking of exotic sports fish into the river has led to a serious decline in the diversity and abundance of native fish.

A total of 63 species of fish have been found in the river, including the glassfish, barred grunter, Snub-nosed Garfish, Fly-specked hardyhead, Mouth almighty, Bigeye Trevally, Goby, Jungle Perch, oxeye herring, eastern rainbowfish, Bony bream, Spotted scat, Giant gudgeon, Freshwater Longtom and Seven-spot Archerfish.

See also

List of rivers of Queensland
William Walter Mason Bridge

References

Rivers of Far North Queensland
Cairns, Queensland
Bodies of water of the Coral Sea